Stockton Riverside College is a further education college located in Thornaby-on-Tees, North Yorkshire, England. The college offers vocational courses, apprenticeship training, higher education and professional courses.

It is part of the Education Training Collective, including Redcar and Cleveland College, Bede Sixth Form College, NETA Training and The Skills Academy. The college is a partner of the Teesside University College Partnership (TUCP).

External links
 Stockton Riverside College homepage

Further education colleges in County Durham
Education in the Borough of Stockton-on-Tees
Thornaby-on-Tees